Football 7-a-side at the 1984 Summer Paralympics consisted of two events for men.

At the 1984 Summer Paralympics, the first cerebral palsy only sports were added to the program with the inclusion of CP football and boccia.

Medal summary

Men's CP 
Six teams competed in the men's CP football 7-a-side competition, Belgium won the gold medal against Ireland while Great Britain won the bronze medals after beating Portugal.

Preliminaries
Group A

Group B

Bronze medal match

Gold medal match

Men's wheelchair 
Three teams competed in the men's wheelchair football 7-a-side competition, the United States won the gold medal after winning against Canada and Great Britain who got the silver and bronze medals respectively.

References 

 

 
1984 Summer Paralympics events
1984
Paralympics